Auratonota tessellata is a species of moth of the family Tortricidae. It is found in Brazil.

The wingspan is about 17 mm. The coloration is similar to Auratonota virgata, but the radial streak is smaller and the dorsum is paler and ocherous orange, suffused gray in the basal half, with several whitish cream lines. The terminal area is grayer than in A. virgata. The hindwings are rather dark and brownish.

References

Moths described in 2000
Auratonota
Moths of South America